The Baise Morning Post, was a Baise-based Chinese-language metropolitan newspaper published in China. The newspaper was officially introduced on December 11, 2009 by Youjiang Daily Agency (右江日报社) in Baise, Guangxi.

Baise Morning Post was a sub-paper of the Youjiang Daily (右江日报) and a municipal-level news media organization.

History
Baise Morning Post was founded on December 11, 2009 to commemorate the 80th anniversary of the Baise Uprising led and launched by Deng Xiaoping.

At the end of 2019, the newspaper announced that it would cease publication on January 1, 2020.

References

Defunct newspapers published in China
Publications established in 2009
2009 establishments in China
Publications disestablished in 2020